Pahala is a census-designated place (CDP) in Hawaii County, Hawaii, United States. The population was 1,403 at the 2020 census.

History

Pahala was created by a sugarcane plantation. The area selected to house the sugar refinery had several key features: 
 a flat plateau on a sloping mountainous region
 direct access to a water well
 a strategic central location to sugarcane fields
In Hawaiian, Pāhala refers to the ashes of leaves from the hala tree (Pandanus tectorius). Long ago, when cracks were found in the sugarcane fields, workers would stuff them with hala leaves and burn them.

For years, Pahala consisted of a manager's house, several plantation homes, a general store, and the sugar refinery. Many of the sugarcane workers were housed in small camps in and around Pahala and in camps situated throughout the outlying sugarcane fields. Many of these camps were self-sufficient. They consisted of eight to twelve plantation dwellings with a small store. Some camps had specialty shops such as a blacksmith or a simple barbershop. As time passed some installed gas stations.

In 1881, the first public school in the district of Kau was established in Kapapala. The humble campus consisted of just two buildings. Some years later the school and its two buildings were relocated to Pahala and called Pahala High and Elementary School. In 1959, as Hawaii Territory became the state of Hawaii, the last class of the Pahala High School held commencement ceremonies. The school then became Kaū High and Pahala Elementary School. It is the second oldest public school in the state of Hawaii, behind Lāhaināluna School in Lāhainā. Still in use today at Kaū High is Kapono Building, the oldest public school building west of the Rocky Mountains. The only other public school in the district of Kaū is Nāālehu Elementary. Nāālehu once had a high school. Today, students attend grades kindergarten through 6th grade in Nāālehu.

As time progressed, Pahala became the focal town of the northeastern side of the district of Kaū; Nāālehu became the other focal town to the south of the district. Businesses from outer camps migrated to Pahala to set up shop. With social and economic changes came the demands for convenience. Soon, more stores opened up. A bank and gas stations were built. For leisure, a town hall or "Club House" was built and used by the plantation and the community to hold meetings and parties. In the early 1940s Pahala Theatre was built.

By the early 1960s, C. Brewer & Co. had decided to phase out all of the camps and move homes and other structures to Pahala. At this time C. Brewer explored other alternatives to diversify into, eventually settling on macadamia nuts. Considered a weed in their native Australia, macadamia trees flourished into a new niche market for Hawaii.

The early 1970s demonstrated how influential the world's economy can be to Pahala. The 1970s brought about fuel shortages, and developing nations began to produce cheaper sugar. During the 1970s C. Brewer proposed the perfect opportunity to diversify. A gentleman by the name of Bob Shleser had proposed to Doc Buyers (then CEO of C. Brewer) the idea and technology to convert the Pahala Sugar Mill to produce ethanol fuel from sugarcane. Shleser also proposed that Hawaii County pass a bill that would require 25% of all vehicles on the island to be retrofitted to use ethanol by 1985. Doc Buyers, however, decided against it.

By the late 1970s, with sugar's looming demise, C. Brewer instead decided to expand its macadamia nut operations. They began to phase out sugarcane fields that encircled Pahala, converting them to grow macadamia trees.

By the mid 1980s it was apparent that sugar had seen its heyday. Honuapo's mill had closed in 1972 and its workers transferred to Pahala. But other sugarcane plantations around the island began to close as well. Still, the Pahala Sugar Mill continued to produce record tons per acre, but at a steep price. At the time it cost $1.50 to produce , which would then sell for $0.60. Congress had proposed bills that placed huge tariffs and taxes on imported sugar. But economically, even those measures could not stave off the inevitable.

In the 1990s, it was all too evident that sugarcane had lost its lustre. C. Brewers' investors were getting older and demanded Doc Buyers cut their losses and liquidate. In 1994, Buyers made a last-ditch effort to keep the mill running. But it required all workers to take drastic pay cuts; most would have had to accept minimum wage. The workers refused. That sealed the fate of the sugar legacy in Pahala. The last sugarcane was hauled and processed at the mill. Over the next two years the mill was dismantled and sold as parts to other manufacturing plants around the world. The sugarcane plantation and mill shut down in April 1996.

Many who lived and worked in Pahala moved on to other jobs around the island. Some took jobs in the hotel industry. Some commute up to five hours a day to and from jobs at resorts along the Kohala coast. Some moved to Maui and Kauai and worked at sugarcane plantations there. Others moved to the mainland to try a fresh start. Many old timers that have generations of family ties to Pahala had passed on. Many in the younger generation have chosen not to return.

Still, there are those that have found their roots and figured out a way to remain in Pahala. In fact, unlike many other places where the larger plantation homes were purchased by outsiders coming to live in Hawaii, the manager homes in Pahala were mostly purchased by local people who have stepped up to the new economy and have such jobs as doctor, bakery manager, fisherman, policeman, painting contractor and other jobs important to the community. Some new people have also moved in, restored the historic homes and established their roots, and now call Pahala home.

There has also been a movement to preserve the shoreline near Pahala, called the Kaū Coast, which is the longest uninhabited coast in Hawaii. Its  now include  of oceanfront park, for which the community raised more than $4 million to purchase and set aside forever. Another  along the coast called Kawa is likely to be preserved. Inland, more than  have been added to Hawaii Volcanoes National Park, which now circles Pahala in the mountains above the village.

Geography
Hawaii Route 11 forms the southeast border of the community. The highway leads northeast  to Hilo and southwest  to Nāālehu.

Climate
Pahala has a dry-summer tropical savanna climate (As) with hot daytime temperatures and mild nighttime temperatures year round and a summer dry season. Precipitation peaks during the month of November.

Economy

Pahala's main industries include one of the world's largest macadamia nut growing orchards, cattle and horse ranching, small independent Kaū Coffee farms, and the Kaū Coffee Mill & Visitor Center. Kaū Coffee has won many international coffee tasting competitions.

A former sugar plantation town, Pahala is the district hub for education and health services, including a pharmacy, hospital, clinic, preschool and public school as well as a library.

Plantation houses, from small cottages to large homes and the former plantation manager's manor, have been restored around the village, serving local families and visitors to Hawaii Volcanoes National Park and Punaluu Black Sand Beach. The village has a post office, swimming pool, two food stores, fire station and gas station. Fisherman sell their catch and farmers sell their produce on the roadside in the village. There is a Catholic, an Assembly of God, and a Baptist church, as well as a Buddhist Hoangwanji and a Tibetan Buddhist temple up the mountain in Wood Valley.

The Kaū District's regional newspaper – the Kaū Calendar – with offices in Pahala, is online daily and printed monthly.

Pahala hosts the annual Kaū Coffee Festival and Kaū Coffee Trail Run, Science Camps of America for teenagers each summer, and many family reunions and weddings, as well as NGO, company, music and dance retreats.

Demographics

As of the census of 2000, there were 1,378 people, 443 households, and 334 families residing in the CDP. The racial makeup of the CDP was 8.78% White, 0.07% Native American, 47.68% Asian, 10.45% Pacific Islander, 0.51% from other races, and 32.51% from two or more races. Hispanic or Latino of any race were 6.31% of the population.

There were 443 households, out of which 33.4% had children under the age of 18 living with them, 55.5% were married couples living together, 12.0% had a female householder with no husband present, and 24.6% were non-families. 21.2% of all households were made up of individuals, and 12.2% had someone living alone who was 65 years of age or older.  The average household size was 3.08 and the average family size was 3.51.

In the CDP the population was spread out, with 27.3% under the age of 18, 9.5% from 18 to 24, 21.0% from 25 to 44, 23.3% from 45 to 64, and 18.9% who were 65 years of age or older.  The median age was 40 years. For every 100 females, there were 100.0 males.  For every 100 females age 18 and over, there were 97.6 males.

The median income for a household in the CDP was $30,243, and the median income for a family was $31,548. Males had a median income of $25,375 versus $21,023 for females. The per capita income for the CDP was $11,450.  About 17.9% of families and 24.2% of the population were below the poverty line, including 32.8% of those under age 18 and 12.8% of those age 65 or over.

See also

 List of census-designated places in Hawaii
 Hawaii Volcanoes Wilderness
 Wood Valley Temple

References

External links

Kaū Coffee Mill
Kaū Coffee Festival

Census-designated places in Hawaii County, Hawaii
Sugar plantations in Hawaii
Populated places on Hawaii (island)